The Modern Institute of Technology and Management (MITM)) is an engineering and management institute in Bhubaneswar, the capital of Odisha. This institution is approved by All India Council for Technical Education and affiliated to Biju Patnaik University of Technology, Rourkela.  This college was established in 2008 by Prof. Dr. K.C.Dash under the Basanti Dash trust.

Campus
This Institute has well equipped laboratories, Workshop along with English language laboratory. Computer labs have facilities with Linux platform with intranet and internet facilities.

Courses
This college offers graduation courses (B.Tech.) in:
 Electrical Engineering
 Electrical and Electronics Engineering
 Electronics and Communication Engineering
 Civil Engineering
 Mechanical Engineering
 Computer Science and Engineering

and Post Graduation Course (MBA) in:
 Human Resource Management
 Marketing Management
 Financial Management

Departments
Departments present in this institute are:
 Electrical Department
 Electronics Department
 Mechanical Department
 Civil Department
 Basic Science and Humanities Department
 Management Department

See also
 List of colleges affiliated to Biju Patnaik University of Technology

References

External links
 
  
 

Private engineering colleges in India
All India Council for Technical Education
Engineering colleges in Odisha
Universities and colleges in Bhubaneswar
Science and technology in Bhubaneswar
Colleges affiliated with Biju Patnaik University of Technology
Educational institutions established in 2008
2008 establishments in Orissa